In enzymology, a hydroxymandelonitrile glucosyltransferase is an enzyme that catalyzes the chemical reaction

UDP-glucose + 4-hydroxymandelonitrile  UDP + taxiphyllin

Thus, the two substrates of this enzyme are UDP-glucose and 4-hydroxymandelonitrile, whereas its two products are UDP and taxiphyllin.

This enzyme belongs to the family of glycosyltransferases, specifically the hexosyltransferases.  The systematic name of this enzyme class is UDP-glucose:4-hydroxymandelonitrile glucosyltransferase. Other names in common use include cyanohydrin glucosyltransferase, and uridine diphosphoglucose-cyanohydrin glucosyltransferase.  This enzyme participates in tyrosine metabolism.

References

 
 

EC 2.4.1
Enzymes of unknown structure